"All of My Life" is a 1944 song composed by Irving Berlin. It was first recorded in 1945 by Bing Crosby whose version reached No. 12 in the Billboard charts. Other chart hits in 1945 were by Sammy Kaye and his Orchestra (vocal by Billy Williams) and by The Three Suns.

Sarah Vaughan and Billy Eckstine recorded it for their album Sarah Vaughan and Billy Eckstine Sing the Best of Irving Berlin (1957).
Tony Bennett included it on his album Bennett/Berlin (1987)

The song can be heard on the soundtrack of the 1972 film The Godfather.

See also
List of jazz standards

References

1940s jazz standards
1944 songs
Songs written by Irving Berlin
Jazz compositions in C major